No Education = No Future (Fuck the Curfew) is an EP by Scottish post-rock group Mogwai, released in the UK through Chemikal Underground in 1998.

Overview 
No Education = No Future (Fuck the Curfew) is Mogwai's second EP. It features three tracks, "Xmas Steps", "Rollerball" (both recorded at CaVa Studios in Glasgow, Scotland and produced by Geoff Allan in April 1998), and "Small Children in the Background" (recorded at Chem19 Studios in Hamilton, Scotland and produced by Andy Miller in May 1998). The curfew mentioned in the title of the EP refers to a curfew which was imposed upon all under-16s in Lanarkshire, Scotland, which made it illegal for them to be out after 9pm. The promo for the EP originally featured the song "Helps Both Ways" (also recorded at CaVa Studios and produced by Geoff Allan), which sampled American football coach John Madden without permission, so consequently, the song was replaced by "Small Children in the Background" on the actual EP. A re-recording of "Helps Both Ways" later appeared on the 1999 album, Come On Die Young. A re-recorded version of "Xmas Steps", entitled "Christmas Steps", also appears on Come On Die Young. All three tracks on the EP later appeared on the 2000 compilation album, EP+6.

Track listings 
Songs and music by Mogwai.
 CD CHEM026CD 12" CHEM026
 "Xmas Steps" – 11:10
 "Rollerball" – 3:45
 "Small Children in the Background" – 6:49
 Promo CD PCHEM026CD
 "Xmas Steps" – 11:10
 "Rollerball" – 3:45
 "Helps Both Ways" – 5:19

Personnel 
 Stuart Braithwaite – guitar
 Dominic Aitchison – bass guitar
 Martin Bulloch – drums
 John Cummings – guitar
 Luke Sutherland – violin on "Xmas Steps"
 Geoff Allan – producer on "Xmas Steps" and "Rollerball"
 Andy Miller – producer on "Small Children in the Background"

Release history 
No Education = No Future (Fuck the Curfew) was released in the United Kingdom in 1998.

Notes

External links 
 

Mogwai EPs
1998 EPs